Shamshir Mahalleh (also Romanized as Shamshīr Maḩalleh) is a village in Feyziyeh Rural District, in the Central District of Babol County, Mazandaran Province, Iran. At the 2006 census, its population was 226, in 61 families.

References 

Populated places in Babol County